= Xuelei =

Chinese perfume company

- Founded: 1995; 31 years ago
- Founder: Weng Zhenguo
- Headquarters: Guangzhou, China

Guangzhou Xuelei Cosmetics Co., Ltd. (Chinese: 广州市雪蕾化妆品有限公司), abbreviated as Xuelei, was founded in 1995 by Mr. Weng Zhenguo. It is a Guangzhou-based OEM/ODM manufacturer specializing in perfumes and fragrances.

== History and Business ==
In 1995, Weng Zhenguo established Xuelei in Guangzhou, entering the fragrance manufacturing industry. Primarily a fragrance supply chain manufacturer, the company operates an independent R&D center and testing laboratory, providing OEM/ODM services to domestic and international markets. Its products reach the Middle East, Southeast Asia, and parts of Europe and North America. Xuelei supplies R&D and production support for perfumes and fragrances to multinational enterprises including Unilever and Disney.

In 2025, Xuelei completed the Xuelei Fragrance Museum in Guangzhou. Spanning 9,500 square meters of experiential space, the museum features exhibits on fragrance culture and history, fragrance ingredient education, and interactive scent experiments, along with over 300 interactive scent experience stations. It has been certified by Guinness World Records as the "Largest Fragrance-Themed Museum in the World," and has become a Guangzhou landmark showcasing fragrance industry culture.
